Railway Platform is a 1955 Indian film about a love triangle between a princess, a poor man and his lover at a train station.  The film marked the debut of Sunil Dutt, who was a popular announcer for Radio Ceylon before he made his breakthrough in Mother India (1957).

Cast
Sunil Dutt as Ram 	
Nalini Jaywant as Naina
Sheila Ramani as Princess Indira
Johnny Walker as Naseebchand
Raj Mehra as Raja Sahib
Leela Mishra as Ram's Mother
Manmohan Krishna as Kavi
Nana Palsikar as Station Master
Jagdeep as Bag Snatcher
Ram Avtar as Priest

Songs
"Dekh Tere Bhagwan Ki Halat Kya Ho Gayi insan" -Artists: Mohammed Rafi, Manmohan Krishna, Shiv Dayal Batish
"Basti Basti Parvat Parvat Gata Jaye Banjara" - Artist: Mohammed Rafi
"Basti Basti Parbat Parbat" (Part- II) - Artist: Manmohan Krishna
"Sone Chandi Me Tulta Ho Jaha Dilo Ka Pyar" - Artist: Mohammed Rafi
"Mast Sham Hai Hatho Me Jaam Hai" - Artist: Asha Bhosle, Shiv Dayal Batish
"Bhajo Ram Bhajo Ram, Mori Baah Pakad Lo Ram" - Artist: Asha Bhosle, Shiv Dayal Batish
"Sakhi Re Tori Doliya Uthayenge Kahar" - Artist: Lata Mangeshkar
"Chand Maddham Hai, Aashma Chup Hai" - Artist: Lata Mangeshkar
"Jiya Kho Gaya O Tera Ho Gaya" - Artist: Lata Mangeshkar
"Andher Nagari Chaupat Raja" - Artists: Mohammed Rafi, Asha Bhosle, Manmohan Krishna, Shiv Dayal Batish

References

External links
 

Indian romance films
1955 films
1950s Hindi-language films
1950s romance films
Hindi-language romance films
Films directed by Ramesh Saigal
Indian black-and-white films